Phrixosceles scioplintha is a moth of the family Gracillariidae. It is known from Taiwan.

References

Gracillariinae
Moths described in 1934